Ričardas Berankis won the title, defeating Rajeev Ram in the final 7–6(7–3), 6–4 .

Seeds

Draw

Finals

Top half

Bottom half

References
 Main Draw
 Qualifying Draw

Sparkassen ATP Challenger - Singles
2015 Singles